1,1-Azobis-1,2,3-triazole is a moderately explosive but comparatively stable chemical compound which contains a long continuous chain of nitrogen atoms, with an unbroken chain of eight nitrogen atoms cyclised into two 1,2,3-triazole rings. It is stable up to 194 °C. The compound exhibits cis–trans isomerism at the central azo group: the trans isomer is more stable and is yellow, while the cis isomer is less stable and is blue. The two rings are aromatic and form a conjugated system with the azo linkage. This chromophore allows the trans compound to be isomerised to the cis when treated with an appropriate wavelength of ultraviolet light.

Related compounds
In 2011, azobis(tetrazole) was prepared by Klapötke and Piercey which has a ten-nitrogen chain. The record was later taken by a N11 chain compound synthesized by a group of Chinese researchers. A branched chain N11 system has also been reported as part of an unstable but highly nitrogen rich azidotetrazole derivative with formula CN.

See also
 HBT (explosive)
 G2ZT
 Diazene

References 

Explosive chemicals
Triazoles